Coe Rail was an excursion and freight rail line running between West Bloomfield, Michigan and Wixom, Michigan, United States.  It was best known for its Michigan Star Clipper Dinner Train.  

In 2007, it was renamed the Michigan Air-Line Railway.

References

Defunct Michigan railroads
Railway companies established in 1984
Railway companies disestablished in 2006
Companies based in Oakland County, Michigan
Spin-offs of the Canadian National Railway
1984 establishments in Michigan
2006 disestablishments in Michigan